Rizzoli & Isles is an American crime drama television series starring Angie Harmon as Jane Rizzoli and Sasha Alexander as Maura Isles. Based on the series of Rizzoli & Isles novels by Tess Gerritsen, the plot follows Boston Homicide police detective Jane Rizzoli and Chief Medical Examiner Dr. Maura Isles combining their experiences and strikingly different personalities to solve cases. It premiered on TNT on July 12, 2010 and aired 105 episodes in seven seasons, concluding on September 5, 2016.

Premise

The series' backstory is inspired by the Maura Isles/Jane Rizzoli series of novels by Tess Gerritsen. Rizzoli appears in the series' first novel, The Surgeon, and Isles is introduced in the second, The Apprentice, which serves as the basis for the television series. Boston detective Jane Rizzoli has been investigating a serial killer named Charles Hoyt, a former medical student banned from medical school for fondling a corpse. He uses his medical knowledge to systematically torture and kill people, usually choosing couples to force one partner (usually the female) to watch the torture and murder of the other. Jane ascertains Hoyt's location, but as she is searching for him, she is hit in the back of the head and knocked unconscious. She is pinned to the floor by scalpels and awakes as Hoyt prepares to cut her throat, but Vince Korsak, Jane's partner, locates her and shoots Hoyt, unfortunately not killing him, saving her life. Jane, reasoning that Korsak would never trust her as his partner after seeing her so vulnerable, applies for a new partner.

The series pilot, "See One. Do One. Teach One", is largely based on the novel The Apprentice. Jane and medical examiner Maura Isles investigate a killer with Hoyt's modus operandi plus an interest in necrophilia. Jane and Maura discover that the copycat was John Stark (Brendan McCarthy), a soldier who met Hoyt in medical school, had his identity erased for CIA black operations, and mimicked Hoyt's MO in a killing spree during said operations. Meanwhile, Hoyt escapes from prison and rejoins his apprentice to continue in killing. Later, Jane's home is broken into, and she is told by Stark, posing as part of BPD, that her neighbor had been killed. She rushes into the van to see the body but finds Hoyt instead. Hoyt and Stark knock her out and kidnap her. When she wakes up they attempt to kill her, but she manages to disarm them by Tasing them and burning Hoyt's eye with a flare. In self-defense, she shoots the apprentice to death, and, when Hoyt reaches for her gun, she shoots him through the hands, giving him injuries similar to those he gave her.

New twists are introduced when Jane and Maura discover that a recent murder victim is actually Maura's previously unknown half-brother, resulting in her discovery that her biological father is notorious gangland criminal Patrick "Paddy" Doyle.

Hoyt returns 18 months later through another apprentice, Lola (real name Emily Stern) in "I'm Your Boogie Man". Having murdered Lola's abusive husband two years earlier, Hoyt uses her Stockholm syndrome, developed over six months in which she was kept in bondage, to his advantage and uses her to stalk Jane. Lola seduces and captures Frankie Rizzoli before tying Jane up. She plans to kidnap Jane until Hoyt can escape from prison, but Jane manages to distract Lola long enough for Frankie to kill Lola with her own revolver.

Hoyt returns again when he arranges for another inmate to be stabbed to lure Jane into the prison so that he can taunt her about another unsolved murder he committed, intending to finally make Jane and Maura his (last) victims before he dies of cancer. While speaking to Jane in the prison infirmary, Hoyt tells her to look at what he is reading—Tess Gerritsen's novel, The Silent Girl. Although she manages to find the bodies of his victims—the family of an old college professor of Hoyt's who was unaware of his expulsion—Hoyt, aided by yet another armed apprentice, ostensibly a prison guard, who was responsible for the stabbing that brought Jane back into his sphere. Locked into Hoyt's cell, Jane kills Hoyt by stabbing him and saving Maura. The apprentice is shot dead by arriving police.

Cast and characters

Main
 Angie Harmon as Jane Clementine Rizzoli: a Boston detective in the Homicide Unit. From an Italian American family, Jane is brash, sarcastic, and often prickly but also a confident and independent woman as well as a brilliant detective. She is the tomboy daughter of an overprotective mother, Angela, and an insensitive father, Frankie Sr. Her parents eventually separate. She is extremely competitive, especially with her younger brother, Frankie (also a cop), who is often caught in her shadow. Jane can tackle a perp like a linebacker. She rarely lets her guard down with anyone, except her best friend, Maura Isles. She is something of a slob; her apartment has been shown on several occasions to be quite messy, and in one episode she claimed to have just opened a box of cereal five years after originally buying it. As a child, she was slightly chubby, earning her the nickname "Roly-Poly Rizzoli". She mentioned in one episode that she played field hockey as an attacker in junior college. She is the eldest Rizzoli sibling, and graduated from high school in 1994, which puts Jane's birth year at 1976. She is hopeless with men and allergic to dogs, but she winds up taking in Jo Friday, a stray dog rescued by her former partner, Korsak. Raised in the blue-collar Boston suburb of Revere, Jane has fought long and hard to win the respect of her colleagues, but it is her relationship with her equally stubborn mother, Angela Rizzoli, that sometimes proves to be her biggest headache. During her time on the force, she had a traumatic experience at the hands of a serial killer known as "The Surgeon", Charles Hoyt. While trying to rescue one of his victims, she was taken by surprise from behind and almost became a victim herself. She has matching scars in the center of her palms where Hoyt stabbed her with scalpels, keeping her pinned to the ground. Her original partner, Vince Korsak, saved her life, and Jane survived the brutal, near-death attack by Hoyt. Although she put Hoyt behind bars, she is still haunted by him. She learned that she was pregnant at the end of season four, owing to a liaison with her old boyfriend Casey, but lost the baby midway through the fifth season when she was attacked while protecting a key witness in a case.  In the final season, Jane takes a new job as an instructor at the FBI Academy in Quantico, Virginia, and works her final case with the Boston PD in the series finale, "Ocean-Frank".
 Sasha Alexander as Dr. Maura Dorothea Isles: the Commonwealth of Massachusetts' Chief Medical Examiner. Isles is a forensic expert working at the Boston Police Department and Jane's best friend. Maura is a walking encyclopedia, able to spout out facts regardless of whether or not they are relevant to a case. She has a pet tortoise named Bass, after noted forensic anthropologist William M. Bass. Maura is not easily ruffled and has a steady temperament. She absolutely loves examining dead bodies, but she has a tendency to diagnose living people a little too often. She is the adopted only child of a wealthy family. In high school, she was nicknamed "Maura-The-Bore-A" because her classmates thought she was boring. She is always impeccably dressed and is known around the force as "Queen of the Dead"; her ring tone on Jane's phone appropriately plays Chopin's "Funeral March". Maura is the complete opposite of Jane, though they are best friends. Though Maura is socially awkward and has trouble with men because of her brutal honesty and habit of revealing all their medical conditions, she is not awkward around Jane. She can analyze x-rays and blood chemistries and can slice open muscles and organs but possesses no scalpel with which to dissect human emotions. Maura also cannot lie; if she does, she breaks out in hives. It is later revealed that her biological father is an Irish crime boss named Paddy Doyle, something she finds out while investigating her half-brother's death. She finds out in the episode "What Doesn't Kill You" (3.1) that her father told her biological mother that she died on the day she was born, August 7, 1976. She subsequently visited a cemetery containing a gravestone with the name "Baby Maura Doyle" on it.  In the series finale, "Ocean-Frank", Maura takes a sabbatical from the ME's office to go to Paris, France, and work on her novel.
 Lorraine Bracco as Angela Rizzoli: Jane, Frankie and Tommy's overbearing mother. Angela is fiercely protective of her children, saying she has not slept since Jane decided to become a cop. Angela wishes Jane could be a little more feminine and is constantly trying to set her up on dates. After her divorce, she spent some time working in the precinct's café, and dated Lieutenant Cavanagh, but she quit the job and broke up with Cavanagh when she decided that she needed to re-evaluate her life. She currently works at the bar that Vince Korsak bought and that they all frequent.
 Bruce McGill as Vincent "Vince" Walter Korsak: Rizzoli's former partner. The two maintain a close bond after years of working together, but Korsak is clearly bothered that he is no longer partnered with Jane. He seems to care for her like a daughter and is nearly as protective of her as Angela is. It is revealed in the series pilot that he saved her life from Hoyt. He will drop whatever he is doing on a moment's notice to rescue an animal, and enjoys watching videos of dogs on the Internet. After remaining a detective for nearly his entire career, Korsak was finally promoted to sergeant-detective in season two, and took the lieutenant's exam in season five. In preparing for retirement, Vince bought the local bar that they all frequent, the Dirty Robber, and employed Angela. He was a US Marine and served during the Vietnam War. Korsak has been divorced 3 times. Despite the jokes that he is behind the times, he is very wise and observant. He has several hobbies, including playing guitar and sailing, Maura even once asked him for his expertise on seaman knots and skills. In the sixth season, he became engaged to Kiki, and he married her in the sixth season finale. In the series finale "Ocean-Frank", Korsak retires from the Boston PD after a thirty-two year career, using his accumulated available vacation time to retire eight weeks early so that he could coincide with Jane and Maura's own new plans for their lives.
 Lee Thompson Young as Barold "Barry" Frost (seasons 1–4): Rizzoli's second partner. Adept with computers and technology, he is terrified of dead bodies and becomes ill at the sight of blood. He is very protective of Jane. In the season five premiere, he is killed in a car accident while returning from vacation (due to Young's suicide in 2013). In the season five finale, the team establishes the Barry Frost Memorial Scholarship, intended for students who are academically gifted and who seek to go into professions that would help others but lack the resources to do so.
 Jordan Bridges as Francesco "Frankie" Rizzoli, Jr.: a police officer and Jane's brother. He looks up to Jane, but does not like feeling caught in her shadow as he tries to make his own way on the police force. Like all the men in Jane's life, Frankie is more protective of Jane than she would like. He is a cop against his mother's wishes, and he sees his sister as a role model. Frankie is promoted to detective in season four, and he starts taking night classes in computer science to increase his skill set in season five. In season seven, he begins a romantic relationship with Nina and eventually successfully proposes to her.
 Brian Goodman as Sean Cavanaugh (seasons 3–4; recurring, seasons 1–2, 5): the lieutenant of the Boston PD's Homicide Unit. Fiercely loyal to Jane and an old friend of Korsak, Sean is willing to bend the rules for his guys. It is later discovered that Sean lost his wife and son in a fire (set by Paddy Doyle) back when he and Korsak were rookies. Sean dates Angela Rizzoli for a period of time but they eventually break up.
 Idara Victor as Nina Holiday (seasons 6–7; recurring, season 5): a crime scene analyst and computer technician. Formerly a detective in Chicago, Holiday transferred to Boston Homicide to hone her analytical skills in an office-based environment. Following Nina's being shot by Alice Sands in the sixth-season finale, Frankie Rizzoli begins a romantic relationship with her in the seventh season, and later successfully proposes to her in the finale.
 Adam Sinclair as Dr. Kent Drake (season 7; recurring, season 6): a lab technician, and Maura's new assistant starting in the sixth season. He is a Scot with a military background, having  served in the Middle East. In the series finale, "Ocean-Frank", Kent is set to oversee the Commonwealth of Massachusetts' Medical Examiner's Office during Maura's sabbatical.

Recurring
 Annabeth Gish as Alice Sands. Alice McFadden was born into a distinguished law enforcement family, but she dropped out of the police academy while Jane was enrolled. Alice was second in her class behind Jane, after having been the best at everything prior to then. This feeling of inferiority resulted in her dangerous fixation on Jane, which led Alice to turn to a life of crime. She inserted herself into a circle of tunnel residents and was able to make them do her bidding, but she ended up being arrested. After being released with help from lawyer Phillip Dayton, Alice began her revenge plans on Jane. Following a shootout at Korsak's wedding reception, Jane seemed to make a personal vendetta against Alice. Jane finally corners Alice, who has taken a teenager hostage, and shoots her dead. This leaves her team to wonder if Jane shot her in the line of duty or as an act of vengeance.
 Tina Huang as Susie Chang, the senior criminalist of the Boston Police Department's crime laboratory. She has described herself as having a very physical memory. For example, when circumstances required her to take point in an investigation, she made various dioramas to explain her reasoning. In the third-season episode "Class Action Satisfaction", she is revealed to be a nudist. She is killed in the sixth-season episode, "Misconduct," as part of a complex plan to frame the forensics department for poor handling of a recent case, but the subsequent investigation exposed the killer's true agenda.
 Brian Dennehy as Detective Kenny Leahy.
 Donnie Wahlberg as Lieutenant Joe Grant, an old rival of Jane's who has known her since childhood. He constantly made fun of her, calling her "Frog Face" and "Roly-Poly Rizzoli" because she was slightly chubby when she was younger. When he leaves for Washington, D.C, after being appointed as the liaison between Boston and Homeland Security, he claims that he has liked her for a very long time.
 John Doman as Patrick "Paddy" Doyle, an Irish-American crime boss and the biological father and protector of Maura Isles. To protect her from his diehard father, Paddy claimed Maura had died as a baby and made sure she was adopted.
 Jacqueline Bisset as Constance Isles, a visual artist and the adoptive mother of Dr. Maura Isles. She loves Maura but is sorry that they don't have a close relationship.
 Colin Egglesfield as Thomas "Tommy" Rizzoli, the well-meaning, good-looking but dim younger brother of Jane and Frankie. Convicted for running over a priest (non-fatally) in a crosswalk on his third DUI violation, he returns to the family fold following his release from prison. As of the season two episode "He Ain't Heavy, He's My Brother", he is 32 years old. He tries to kiss Maura to pay her back for her kindness, but she stops him and he develops a crush on her as he works on starting a new life. He later fathers a child, TJ, and grows up a lot.
 Chris Vance as Charles (Casey) Jones, an old flame of Jane's from high school, reunited with Jane during season two. A US Army officer assigned to the Middle East, he returns to Boston in season three but breaks up with Jane because of injuries that left him partially paralyzed below the waist. He returns in season four's first episode after a successful operation and proposes to Jane, but when he receives the offer of a promotion to colonel, he decides to stay in the army, leaving Jane behind, since she was unwilling to leave her life. He is aware that Jane was pregnant with his child, but he respects her decision to raise the child alone, as he had also made the choice to return to the army; she loses the baby midway through the fifth season after being attacked while protecting a witness.
 Darryl Alan Reed as Rondo, a man with access to information in the criminal world. Although Jane initially dismisses his offer to be her confidential informant, he does become her informant later on, and he provides Jane with information from the criminal world. He has also been shown to have a comical character persona, similar to Larry Laffer. He frequently hits on Jane, calling her "Vanilla", and he eventually develops a friendship with Angela, referring to her as "Mrs. Vanilla". He is revealed to be a former jazz singer in "This Is How a Heart Breaks" but refuses to discuss his past life or to sing.
 Billy Burke as Gabriel Dean, an FBI agent often seen working with the Boston Homicide detectives and the Medical Examiner's Office. He later becomes romantically involved with Jane but she ends this relationship when he tries to use her as part of a plan to capture Paddy Doyle that forced Jane to shoot Paddy.
 Chazz Palminteri as Francesco "Frank" Rizzoli Sr. – father of Jane, Frankie, and Tommy. He owns and runs a plumbing business called Rizzoli and Sons. He and Angela separate and then divorce after the first season. He later tries to have their marriage annulled so that he can remarry in a Catholic ceremony. He returns to announce he has stage 2 prostate cancer, and, despite the news, his family finds it difficult to overlook his past transgressions.
 Matthew Del Negro as Giovanni Gilberti, a dimwitted former classmate of Jane's and a blue-collar auto mechanic. Initially attracted to him against Jane's advice, Maura is quickly nauseated by him. To get him off their backs and halt future advances, Maura and Jane pretend to be dating, which Giovanni repeats in a later episode set at Jane's high school reunion.
 Michael Massee as Charles Hoyt, a sadistic serial killer who kidnapped and stabbed Jane in both hands and continues to threaten Jane, even from behind bars. Hoyt appears in several episodes, including "See One, Do One, Teach One" (episode 1), "I'm Your Boogie Man", and "Remember Me". In the episode "See One, Do One, Teach One", Hoyt and the apprentice are shown attending medical school with Jane. Jane shoots and kills the apprentice and throws a flare at Hoyt. Jane then shoots him in the hands and says, "We match." In the episode "Remember Me", Hoyt, dying of cancer, lures Jane and Maura into his hospital room with the assistance of a new apprentice, intending to kill Jane before he dies, but Jane manages to get the upper hand and stabs and kills Hoyt with a scalpel while saying, "I win." Despite his death, he continues to haunt Jane and the team, and he was mentioned in the next two seasons after his death. While dealing with the murders committed by Dennis Rockmond ("Melt My Heart of Stone"), Jane speculates that he may be an apprentice of Hoyt due to the ritualistic nature of his crimes, and "No One Mourns the Wicked" saw the team deal with a forensic pathologist and her son (conceived by her father's abuse) who were committing murders inspired by Hoyt.
 Sharon Lawrence as Dr. Hope Martin, Maura's biological mother, who was told by Paddy Doyle that Maura died as a baby. She is a noted medical doctor with another, much-younger daughter, Caitlin.
 Emilee Wallace as Cailin Martin, Hope's daughter and Maura's half-sister. Despite Caitlin's initial hostility, Maura later donated her kidney to Cailin to save her life.
 Alexandra Holden as Lydia Sparks, a ditzy young woman who is heavily pregnant when she is befriended by Angela. It is soon revealed that the child she is carrying is the child of either Angela's son Tommy or Angela's ex-husband Frank. Eventually the child is known as T.J., for "Tommy Junior", after a test confirms that Tommy is the father.
 Jaz Sinclair as Tasha Williams (season 5), a high school student who witnessed a shooting, saved by Jane from the shooter..

Production
The untitled project was on TNT's development slate as early as March 2008. In October 2009, TNT placed a cast-contingent pilot order under the original title, Rizzoli. The pilot script was written by Janet Tamaro. Angie Harmon was the first actress cast, taking the title role of police detective Jane Rizzoli. Sasha Alexander won the role of medical examiner Dr. Maura Isles after auditioning with Harmon. Bruce McGill signed as Rizzoli's former partner, Sgt. Vince Korsak. Lee Thompson Young was cast as her new partner, Barry Frost. The role of Rizzoli's younger brother Frankie was filled by Jordan Bridges. Lorraine Bracco signed on as Rizzoli's mother, Angela. In early 2010, Billy Burke was announced as FBI agent Gabriel Dean.

In late January 2010, TNT green-lighted the pilot to series with the new title Rizzoli & Isles. Ten episodes were ordered and the show premiered on July 12, 2010. The series is produced on the Paramount Pictures lot in Hollywood, California. Owing to a sponsorship deal between MillerCoors and Turner Broadcasting for the summer 2010 season, the series included product placement for MGD 64, including billboards in the backgrounds of some scenes. The first season was additionally sponsored by Vonage. After having aired three episodes in 2010, the series was renewed for a second season, which aired from July 11 to December 26, 2011. In August 2011, TNT ordered a third season, which aired from June 5 through December 25, 2012. On June 29, 2012, TNT ordered a fourth season, which aired from June 25, 2013, through March 18, 2014. On December 9, 2014, TNT renewed Rizzoli & Isles for an 18-episode sixth season.

In August 2013, production on the fourth season was suspended when cast member Lee Thompson Young was found dead at his Los Angeles apartment from a self-inflicted gunshot wound. In the second half of the fifth season, a new character, crime scene analyst Nina Holiday, played by Idara Victor, was introduced. Series executive producer Jan Nash stated that Nina would not replace Young's character, Frost. Instead, the existing characters were given "new dynamics", according to Nash. For example, Jane and Korsak work more cases together, and Frankie is more involved in solving cases.

Broadcast
Rizzoli & Isles started to air on GEM in Australia. As of 2016, Superchannel is no longer carrying the show.

In the international, Rizzoli & Isles has aired on many NBCUniversal networks in the international area such as Poland, Spain, South Africa, Portugal, France, Turkey, and Russia.

- The show has started to air on Calle 13 in Spain.

- The series was broadcast on Universal Channel in Portugal, and South Africa.

- Rizzoli & Isles began airing on Diva Universal in Turkey and Poland.

- The show has begun airing in Russia on Studio Universal.

A subscription is required.

The series, shown in original broadcast order, began airing on Lifetime in September 2020 as well as Start TV in January 2021.

Streaming
Rizzoli & Isles is available to stream on HBO Max.
It streams on Amazon Prime in the UK and in Canada.

Reception

Ratings
The series started strong in the ratings, as 7.55 million viewers tuned in for the premiere episode. Rizzoli & Isles was the second most-watched cable program on the evening of July 12, 2010, behind its lead-in, The Closer, which had 110,000 more viewers. The show finished the week in third behind The Closer and the final episode of Deadliest Catch.

The premiere set a record as the highest-rated debut for a commercial-supported cable series, and it was the second-highest debut ever for a basic cable TV series. Rizzoli & Isles is second only to the 2008 premiere of Raising the Bar, which attracted 7.7 million viewers during its commercial-free debut. Live + 7 day ratings for the premiere updated the show's status as the all-time most-watched cable series launch, with DVR viewers increasing the show's rating to just over 9 million viewers.

The show has ranked in the top five cable programs all five seasons and was the number one basic cable program in its fifth season.

Critical response
The show has been described as having lesbian undertones, and the purported sexual attraction between Rizzoli and Isles has been the subject of critical and fan attention, with sites such as The Advocate connecting the show's lesbian subtext to its popularity. Harmon said that she was not surprised by the attention and that, while it was "super fun" to play a role that has some same-sex romantic vibes", the characters are "straight" and "just best friends". Alexander said that she was not initially aware of the subtext but believed it reflected the characters' chemistry. She also expressed skepticism that Rizzoli and Isles' friendship was out of the ordinary.

Awards and nominations

References

Works cited

External links 

 
 

2010 American television series debuts
2016 American television series endings
2010s American crime drama television series
2010s American mystery television series
2010s American police procedural television series
American detective television series
English-language television shows
Fictional duos
Television shows based on American novels
Television series by Warner Horizon Television
Television series by Warner Bros. Television Studios
Television shows set in Boston
TNT (American TV network) original programming
Fictional portrayals of the Boston Police Department
Television shows featuring audio description
Television duos